Ashe Cottage, also known as the Ely House, is a historic Carpenter Gothic house in Demopolis, Alabama.  It was built in 1832 and expanded and remodeled in the Gothic Revival style in 1858 by William Cincinnatus Ashe, a physician from North Carolina.  The cottage is a -story wood-frame building, the front elevation features two semi-octagonal gabled front bays with a one-story porch inset between them.  The gables and porch are trimmed with bargeboards in a design taken from Samuel Sloan's plan for "An Old English Cottage" in his 1852 publication, The Model Architect.  The house is one of only about twenty remaining residential examples of Gothic Revival architecture remaining in the state.  Other historic Gothic Revival residences in the area include Waldwic in Gallion and Fairhope Plantation in Uniontown.  Ashe Cottage was added to the Alabama Register of Landmarks and Heritage on August 22, 1975, and to the National Register of Historic Places on 19 October 1978.

The Ashe House is given as one of four examples of the paired-gable subtype of Gothic Revival houses in A Field Guide to American Houses (1984).  It is noted as having "very delicate lace-like porches and vergeboard details."  Paired gables appear in about five percent of Gothic Revival houses in America.

References

National Register of Historic Places in Marengo County, Alabama
Houses on the National Register of Historic Places in Alabama
Houses in Demopolis, Alabama
Carpenter Gothic architecture in Alabama
Carpenter Gothic houses in the United States
Gothic Revival architecture in Alabama
Properties on the Alabama Register of Landmarks and Heritage